Diguetinus raptator is a species of harvestmen in a monotypic genus in the family Sclerosomatidae from Jalisco, Mexico.

References

Harvestmen
Monotypic arachnid genera